Ali bin Abdulwahed Al-Sijelmasi (Arabic: علي بن عبدالواحد السجلماسي), born in Tafilat around 1594 and died in 1647 AD in Algeria, was a Moroccan Maliki jurist, writer, physician and linguist.

His life 
He is Abu Al-Hasan Ali bin Abdulwahed bin Mohammad bin Siraj Al-Sijelmasi Al-Jaza’iri Al-Ansari. He was born in 1594 in Tafilat to a family belonging to the companion Saad bin Ubadah, and he grew up in Sijelmasa. He studied in Fez at the hands of Afif Al-Din Abdullah bin Ali bin Taher Al-Hasani, Muhammad bin Abi Bakr Al-Dula'i and Shihab Al-Maqri. He performed Hajj and entered Egypt in 1634 AD and learned from its scholars in that period, such as Sheikh Ahmed Al-Ghunaimi, Sheikh Ahmed bin Abdulwarith Al-Bakri, Al-Nour Al-Ajhouri and others. He returned to Morocco and settled in Fez and became a mufti in Al-Jabal Al-Akhdar. He died of plague in Algeria in 1647.

Works 
He had many books, most of them were written as poetry (composition) in various fields, some of which are in Tafsir (Arabic title: Wa Laken Albr Man Etaqa), the Prophet’s biography (Arabic title: Al-Durra Al-Munifa) and jurisprudence ( Arabic title: Al-Yawaqit Al-Thamina Fi Al-Aqaed wa Al-Ashbah wa Al-Nathaer fi Feqh Alem Al-Madina, Jame'atu Al-Asrar, and Masalek Al-Wusool fi Madarek Al-Usool), and a composition in (Arabic: Wafeyyat Al-Aayan), and others in grammar, morphology, semantics and Tafsir, arguing and logic, medicine, anatomy and others.

Published books
 (Arabic title: Menhatu Al-Qayyum on the Introduction of Ibn Ajrum: Explanation of Al-Ajrumiyah in Grammar), Dar Ibn Hazm, Beirut, 2018, .
 (Arabic title: Sharh Al-Sijelmasi on the Completion of the Curriculum, West African Manuscripts.

Books about him
 (Arabic title: Kamal Bel Harka, Allama Abul-Hassan Ali bin Abdulwahed Al-Ansari Al-Sijelmasi Al-Salawi Al-Jazaeri) (d. 1070), His Life and Traditions, Dar Al-Irfan for Publishing and Distribution, 2020, Agadir, Morocco
 (Arabic title: Kamal BelHarka, Sharh Yawaqit AlMadina fima Entama le Alem Al-madina: From the Rules and from the Singularities of Analogies with Benefits), for the scholar Sidi Mohammad bin Abi Al-Qasim Al-Sijelmasi Al-Baja’di Al-Rebati, study and investigation, Dar Ibn Hazm, Beirut, 2015, ISBN 978995955.

References 

Moroccan writers
Arab scholars
Arab physicians
Arab linguists
1594 births
1647 deaths